Chilanthivala (Spider Web) is a 1982 Indian Malayalam film, directed by Vijayanand and produced by A. Raghunath. The film stars M. N. Nambiar, Sreenath, K. P. Ummer and Captain Raju in the lead roles. The film has musical score by Guna Singh.

Cast
Sreenath as Suresh	
Captain Raju as Aravindan 	
Manavalan Joseph as Paramu	
Kundara Johnny as Inspector Harris	
Meena as Mary 	
K. P. Ummer as Menon
Srividya as School teacher
M. N. Nambiar as Sekharan	
Prathapachandran as Doctor Peter
Roopa as Sarada
Jagathy Sreekumar as Sayippu
Vallathol Unnikrishnan as Shankar
 Thodupuzha Radhakrishnan as Thankappan
 Sudesh
 Stanley
 Rajesh
 Subhadra
 Anthikkadu Mani

Soundtrack
The music was composed by Guna Singh and the lyrics were written by Poovachal Khader.

References

External links
 

1982 films
1980s Malayalam-language films